The Bliss Wind Farm is a 100.5 megawatt wind energy project built by Noble Environmental Power, that opened  May 18, 2008. The $210-million project is in Eagle, New York in Wyoming County, and consists of 67 General Electric 1.5 megawatt turbines.

Project history
June 2007 - New York State Energy Research and Development Authority awards contract to provide renewable energy
June 2007 - Construction begins
June 2007 - Financing of project secured
May 2008 - Operational

See also

Wind power in New York

References

Energy infrastructure completed in 2008
Buildings and structures in Wyoming County, New York
Wind farms in New York (state)